The D. C. Ball House, at 300 San Juan in Aztec, New Mexico, was built in 1901.  It is a hipped roof cottage.  It was listed on the National Register of Historic Places in 1985.

It has shiplap over frame construction, and is one of few well-preserved hipped cottages in Aztec.

References

		
National Register of Historic Places in San Juan County, New Mexico
Houses completed in 1901